Paneer, also known as ponir, is a fresh acid-set cheese common in the Indian subcontinent (Bangladesh, Bhutan, India, Maldives, Nepal, Pakistan and Sri Lanka) made from full-fat buffalo milk or cow milk. It is a non-aged, non-melting soft cheese made by curdling milk with a fruit- or vegetable-derived acid, such as lemon juice.

Etymology
The word paneer entered English from the Hindi-Urdu term panīr, which comes from Persian  'cheese', which comes from Old Iranian. Armenian , Azerbaijani , Turkish  and Turkmen , all derived from Persian , also refer to cheese of any type.

History

The origin of paneer is debated. Ancient Indian, Afghan-Iranian and Portuguese-Bengali origins have been proposed for paneer.

Vedic literature refers to a substance that is interpreted by some authors, such as Sanjeev Kapoor, as a form of paneer. According to Arthur Berriedale Keith, a kind of cheese is "perhaps referred to" in Rigveda 6.48.18. However, Otto Schrader believes that the Rigveda only mentions "a skin of sour milk, not cheese in the proper sense". K. T. Achaya mentions that acidulation of milk was a taboo in the ancient Indo-Aryan culture, pointing out that the legends about Krishna make several references to milk, butter, ghee and dahi (yogurt), but do not mention sour milk cheese.

Another theory is that like the word itself, paneer originated in Persianate lands and spread to the  Indian subcontinent under Muslim rule. Paneer, according to this theory, was developed and molded to suit local tastes under these rulers, and the Delhi Sultanate and Mughal Empire is when paneer as currently known developed. Another theory states that paneer is Afghan in origin and spread to India from the lands that make up Afghanistan. National Dairy Research Institute states that paneer was introduced into India by Afghan and Iranian invaders. Based on texts such as Charaka Samhita, BN Mathur wrote that the earliest evidence of a heat-acid coagulated milk product in India can be traced to 75-300 CE, in the Kushan-Satavahana era. Sunil Kumar et al. interpret this product as the present-day paneer. According to them, paneer is indigenous to the north-western part of South Asia, and was introduced in India by Afghan and Iranian travellers. Manasollasa, a Sanskrit-language text by the 12th century king Someshvara III, describes Kshiraprakara, a similar sweet food prepared from milk solids after separating boiled milk using a sour substance.

Another theory is that the Portuguese may have introduced the technique of "breaking" milk with acid to Bengal in the 17th century. Thus, according to this theory, Indian acid-set cheeses such as paneer and chhena were first prepared in Bengal, under Portuguese influence.

Preparation

Paneer is prepared by adding food acid, such as lemon juice, vinegar, citric acid or dahi (yogurt), to hot milk to separate the curds from the whey. The curds are drained in muslin or cheesecloth and the excess water is pressed out. The resulting paneer is dipped in chilled water for 2–3 hours to improve its texture and appearance. From this point, the preparation of paneer diverges based on its use and regional tradition.

In North Indian cuisines, the curds are wrapped in cloth, placed under a heavy weight such as a stone slab for two to three hours, and then cut into cubes for use in curries. Pressing for a shorter time (approximately 20 minutes) results in a softer, fluffier cheese.

In Bengali, Odia and other east Indian cuisines, the chhena are beaten or kneaded by hand into a dough-like consistency, heavily salted and hardened to produce paneer (called ponir), which is typically eaten in slices at teatime with biscuits or various types of bread, deep-fried in a light batter or used in cooking.

In the area surrounding the city of Surat in Gujarat, surti paneer is made by draining the curds and ripening them in whey for 12 to 36 hours.

Use in dishes

Paneer is the most common type of cheese used in traditional cuisines from the Indian subcontinent. It is sometimes wrapped in dough and deep-fried or served with either spinach (palak paneer) or peas (mattar paneer). Paneer can be sweet, like the shahi paneer, or spicy, like the chilli paneer.

Paneer dishes
Some paneer recipes include

 Paneer pulao (paneer with rice)
Mattar paneer (paneer with peas)
Shahi paneer (paneer cooked in a rich Mughlai curry)
Paneer tikka (a vegetarian version of chicken tikka, paneer placed on skewers and roasted)
Paneer tikka masala
 Chilli paneer (an Indo-Chinese preparation with spicy chilies, onions and green peppers, usually served dry and garnished with spring onions)
Paneer pakora (paneer fritters)
Palak paneer
Khoya paneer
 Paneer momo
 Paneer butter masala 

Paneer pasanda (shallow-fried stuffed paneer sandwiches in a smooth, creamy onion-tomato based gravy)
 Paneer lababdar
 Paneer Do Pyaaz (named so because 2 onions are used in this recipe).

Similar cheeses

Anari, a fresh mild whey cheese produced in Cyprus, is very similar in taste and texture to fresh Indian paneer. Circassian cheese is produced using a similar method and is close in consistency to paneer, but is usually salted. Farmer cheese (pressed curds) and firm versions of quark are similar except that they are made from cultured milk and may be salted. Although many Indians translate "paneer" into "cottage cheese", cottage cheese is made using rennet extracted from the stomach of ruminants. Queso blanco or queso fresco are often recommended as substitutes in the Americas and Spain as they are more commercially available in many American markets. Queso blanco can be a closer match, as it is acid-set while queso fresco frequently uses rennet at a lower temperature. Both are generally salted, unlike paneer. It is also similar to unsalted halloumi.

See also

References

Indian cuisine
Indian cheeses
Punjabi cuisine
Nepalese cuisine
Vegetarian cuisine
Bengali cuisine
Sri Lankan cuisine
Bangladeshi cuisine
Iranian cuisine